Lauren Wilkinson (born October 17, 1989) is a Canadian rower. She is a 2 time Olympian. She graduated from Princeton University in 2011 with a degree in Ecology and Evolutionary Biology. During her senior year at Princeton, Wilkinson stroked the crew that won the I Eight event at the 2011 NCAA Championships. Wilkinson attended Crofton House School, graduating in 2007. She was awarded the Alumnae Association's Achievement Award of Crofton House School in 2013.

In 2012, Wilkinson won a silver medal at the London Olympics with her coxed women's eight, and in June 2016, she was officially named to Canada's 2016 Olympic team. At the Rio 2016 Olympic Games, Wilkinson placed 5th in the A Final for the coxed women's eight.

Personal life 
Lauren Wilkinson is a younger sister to Jerome and Michael Wilkinson. Jerome Wilkinson rowed at the collegiate and provincial level. Michael Wilkinson also rowed at the 2012 Summer Olympics, who was a member of the Olympic rowing team with Lauren. Parents David and Susan Wilkinson were both national team rowers as well. Lauren first got into rowing at the age of 11, following her brothers into the sport. Wilkinson enjoys photography, reading, and hiking.

See also
List of Princeton University Olympians

References

 

1989 births
Living people
Rowers at the 2012 Summer Olympics
Olympic silver medalists for Canada
Olympic medalists in rowing
Rowers from Vancouver
Canadian female rowers
Medalists at the 2012 Summer Olympics
Princeton University alumni
World Rowing Championships medalists for Canada
Rowers at the 2016 Summer Olympics
Olympic rowers of Canada
21st-century Canadian women